Des Peres may refer to:

Des Peres, Missouri, a  city in St. Louis County, Missouri
Des Peres (band), a band from Australia